Michel Robin (13 November 1930 – 18 November 2020) was a French film, stage, and television actor. A sociétaire of the Comédie-Française since 1996, he also appeared in 120 films from 1966 to 2018. He won several awards for his acting, including the Moliere Award for Best Supporting Actor and the Grand Jury Prize winner at the Locarno Festival in 1979.

Filmography

References

External links

1930 births
2020 deaths
Actors from Reims
French male film actors
Sociétaires of the Comédie-Française
20th-century French male actors
21st-century French male actors
Knights of the Ordre national du Mérite
Officiers of the Ordre des Arts et des Lettres
Deaths from the COVID-19 pandemic in France